Line 3 is a rapid transit line of the Madrid Metro in Madrid. It contains 18 stations across .

History

During this process, all of the stations were modernized and rebuilt, thus giving the original section of Line 3 a brand new look.  station was completely rebuilt adjacent to that of the Line 6, proving an easy connection between the two lines.

This was the first extension of the line since 1951. Further extensions on both ends of the line have been proposed. In the south, the line will be extended to  station, where it will meet Line 12 and Cercanías Line C-3.

Stations

See also
 Madrid
 Transport in Madrid
 List of Madrid Metro stations
 List of metro systems

References

External links

  Madrid Metro (official website)
 Schematic map of the Metro network – from the official site 
 Madrid at UrbanRail.net
 ENGLISH User guide, ticket types, airport supplement and timings
 Network map (real-distance)
 Madrid Metro Map

03 (Madrid Metro)
Railway lines opened in 1936
1936 establishments in Spain